Kalmus is a surname. Notable people with the surname include:

 Ain Kalmus (1906–2001), Estonian writer and theologian
 Alfred Kalmus (1889-1972), Austrian-British music publisher
 Edwin F. Kalmus (1893-1989), American music publisher
 George Kalmus (born 1935), British particle physicist
 Herbert Kalmus (1881-1963), American scientist and engineer
 Marion Kalmus, British artist
 Natalie Kalmus (1882-1965), American Technicolor color supervisor
 Peter Kalmus (artist) (born 1953), Slovak artist and activist
 Peter Kalmus (climate scientist) (born 1974), American climate scientist
 Peter Kalmus (physicist) (born 1933), British particle physicist